Less Than Perfect is an American sitcom that aired on ABC from October 1, 2002, to June 20, 2006; seven episodes unaired by ABC were later aired in syndication by Lifetime in June 2009. The show follows a young female office employee named Claude Casey (played by Sara Rue) after being promoted from temp to permanent assistant for Will Butler (Eric Roberts), one of the most popular TV news anchors. The other assistants, Kipp (Zachary Levi) and Lydia (Andrea Parker), are out to get her, but Claude has friends Ramona (Sherri Shepherd) and Owen (Andy Dick) watching her back. Patrick Warburton and Will Sasso also co-star.

Series overview
{| class="wikitable plainrowheaders" style="text-align:center;"
|-
! colspan="2" rowspan="2" |Season
! rowspan="2" |Episodes
! colspan="2" |Originally aired
|-
! First aired
! Last aired
|-
| bgcolor="#34b2d7" |
| [[List of Less Than Perfect episodes#Season 1 (2002–03)|1]]
| 22
| October 1, 2002
| May 20, 2003
|-
| bgcolor="#9A297E" |
| [[List of Less Than Perfect episodes#Season 2 (2003–04)|2]]
| 24
| September 23, 2003
| May 18, 2004
|-
| bgcolor="#AE1C26" |
| [[List of Less Than Perfect episodes#Season 3 (2004–05)|3]]
| 22
| September 24, 2004
| April 15, 2005
|-
| bgcolor="#FFCC33" |
| [[List of Less Than Perfect episodes#Season 4 (2006)|4]]
| 13
| April 18, 2006
| June 20, 2006
|}

Episodes

Season 1 (2002–03)

Season 2 (2003–04)

Season 3 (2004–05)

Season 4 (2006)

Notes

References
Lifetime - Less Than Perfect
Less Than Perfect on Lifetime at TVGuide.com

Less Than Perfect